is a supermarket chain named for the Kansai region of Japan where its stores are located. Its logo is a bird in the shape of a K. According to the Kansai Super website (http://www.kansaisuper.co.jp/index.php?mode=tenpo), as of 2011 it has 60 stores: 11 in Kōbe city, 17 in the greater Hanshin area of Hyogo Prefecture, 9 in the northern part of Ōsaka Prefecture, 14 in Ōsaka city, 5 in eastern Ōsaka, 3 in southern Ōsaka, and one in Nara, Nara Prefecture.

External links
 Kansai Super Company web site (Japanese).

Supermarkets of Japan
Retail companies established in 1959
Companies based in Hyōgo Prefecture
Companies listed on the Osaka Exchange
Companies listed on the Tokyo Stock Exchange
1959 establishments in Japan